The 1970 Boston University Terriers football team was an American football team that represented Boston University as an independent during the 1970 NCAA College Division football season. In their second season under head coach Larry Naviaux, the Terriers compiled a 5–4 record and outscored opponents by a total of 199 to 141.

Guard Bill Soucy received second-team honors on the 1970 Little All-America college football team.

Schedule

References

Boston University
Boston University Terriers football seasons
Boston University Terriers football